Human trafficking in the Palestine has been observed and reported by numerous sources.

Studies

In December 2009, a 26-page report was published by Sawa, from United Nations Development Fund for Women (UNIFEM), which included that there is a lack of data collection on human trafficking in Palestine. Furthermore, the report calls on Palestinian governmental organizations to establish new legislation which should guarantee that females are treated as victims of crime and not offenders.

Factors
Vast poverty and lack of economic scope have been cited as major factors in human trafficking in the Palestinian territories. Other activities includes sex exploitation and child labor.

References

Palestine
Palestine
Human rights abuses in the State of Palestine